Betsy Ross (1752–1836) was an American woman who is said to have sewn the first American flag.

Betsy Ross may also refer to:

Betsy McCaughey Ross (born 1948), lieutenant-governor of the State of New York 
Betsy King Ross (1921–1989), American actress, anthropologist and author
Khadijah Farrakhan (born Betsy Ross), wife of Louis Farrakhan
Betsy Ross (solitaire), a solitaire card game
TS Betsy Ross, a cruise ship, originally built as TS Leda
Golden Girl (Timely Comics), a Golden Age comic character, whose secret identity was Betsy Ross
A train operated by Amtrak as part of the Clocker service
Betsy Ross (film), a 1917 American silent historical film
Betsy Ross Bridge, a bridge connecting Pennsauken, New Jersey to Philadelphia, Pennsylvania over the Delaware River
Betsy Ross, a journalist in Cincinnati

See also
Betsy Ross House, one of the most visited tourist sites in Philadelphia where Betsy Ross is alleged to have lived
Betsy Ross flag
Elizabeth Ross (disambiguation)

Ross, Betsy